The British Columbia Libertarian Party is a libertarian party in British Columbia, Canada that nominated its first candidates in the 1986 provincial election. There has never been a Libertarian elected to the Legislative Assembly of British Columbia. The most recent election occurred under the leadership of Don Wilson where, in the 2020 British Columbia general election, the party fielded 25 candidates and received 8,360 votes, or 0.4% of the popular vote. Keith Macintyre had the best performance of any BC Libertarian candidate that year, in his electoral district of Penticton where he received 717 votes, or 2.6% of the popular vote. In 2021 they were viewed as a fringe party.

The response to the Covid-19 crisis opened a unique opportunity for the BC Libertarian party as the only provincial party that opposed the public health measures. The most recent changes to the party occurred in 2021 when Keith MacIntyre was elected as party leader during the Annual General Meeting in May. At this time Sandra Filosof-Schipper was elected as deputy leader and Clayton Welwood remained as party president. Other new positions that were filled were Dylan Davidson as Party Treasurer, Brandi McLauchlan as Party Secretary and Rachel Whitehouse, Maizy Thorvaldson and Josh Hardy as executive directors.

The party has been outspoken against perceived overreach of government during covid and has made their presence at many protests and appearing on podcasts during 2021. When vaccine mandates started to begin in late 2021 the Party began writing political exemption letters for those finding themselves in the position of losing their employment based on their medical status.

Purpose and principles 
The BC Libertarian Party adopted the following set of principles during its 2020 Annual General Meeting.

The purpose of the Party is to bring about the election of BC Libertarian Party candidates to the British Columbia Legislative Assembly in promoting the following core principles;

 That no individual or group is permitted to initiate the use of force or fraud against any other,
 That the universal natural rights to life, liberty, property, expression, and the peaceful pursuit of happiness are essential to the preservation of civil society,
 That the role of government is to protect and preserve such rights, and
 That the citizens of British Columbia have the right to defend and be defended from those persons or institutions that seek to diminish any of the above principles.

Party platform 
 Ending the ICBC monopoly on basic auto insurance.
 Allowing for more parental and student choice in education.
 Decentralizing decision making powers to local communities, families, and individuals.
 Abolishing provincial government monopoly on liquor and cannabis distribution.
 Adapting to a changing climate and promoting environmental policies that will have the greatest impact.
 Sweeping tax policy reform, including tripling the basic income tax exemption to $35,000 and abolishing the carbon, fuel, cigarette, liquor, and marijuana taxes.
 Reducing transportation costs through the elimination of various taxes and regulatory bodies, and opening up the market to new innovations like car sharing, bike sharing, ride sharing, and other transportation solutions.
 Removing legal barriers to ride-sharing services like Uber and Lyft.
 Growing the economy by making life more affordable for all British Columbians.
 Supporting British Columbia's resource-based economy.

See also 

 Libertarian Party of Canada
 Libertarian Party of Manitoba
 List of political parties in Canada
 Ontario Libertarian Party

References

External links 
 

Libertarian Party
Classical liberal parties
Libertarianism in Canada
Libertarian parties
Political parties established in 1986
Libertarian Party